Heatly is a surname. Notable people with the surname include:

Kenny Heatly (born 1982), American football player and player of Canadian football
Peter Heatly (1924–2015), Scottish diver
Suetonius Grant Heatly (1751–1793), British judge
William S. Heatly (1912–1984), American politician
Basil Heatley (1933–2019), British athlete.
Bill Heatley (1920–1971), Australian politician.
Bob Heatley (1895–1973), Australian footballer.
Craig Heatley (born 1956), New Zealand businessman.
David Heatley (born 1974), American cartoonist.